Baseball (released as Major League Baseball, Super Challenge Baseball, and World Championship Baseball) is a sport video game produced by Mattel and released for the Intellivision home video game console in 1980. As the best-selling game in the console's history, with more than 1 million copies sold, Baseball put players in control of a nine-man baseball team competing in a standard nine-inning game. When first released, Mattel obtained a license from Major League Baseball, although the only trademarked item used is the MLB logo on the box art. No official team names or player names are in the game.

Gameplay

The game consists of nine innings on a simplified baseball diamond. The team having scored the most runs wins.

Player 1 is always the visiting team and bats at the top of the innings, with Player 2 as the home team and batting at the bottom of the innings. The pitching player selects a pitch by pushing the controller in one of eight cardinal directions, each representing a different speed and direction. The batting player then attempts to hit the ball into play and reach base safely, so that subsequent batters can move to home plate and thus score a run. If the ball is hit into play, the pitching player uses the keypad to select the fielder catch the ball, then selects the player to receive the throw, to put the runner "out".

The batting player is able to advance the base-runners off base in an attempt to steal a base, but the pitching player can counter that with an attempt to pickoff the runners before the pitch is thrown.

If the score is tied at the end of the 9th inning, extra innings are played as necessary until a winner is determined.

Variations from standard baseball
Even though the two teams represented in Baseball are basically the same, the level of simulation is remarkable for its time. A wide array of baseball strategy includes Double plays, triple plays, rundowns, and intentional walks are all possible. Changes include all hits being automatically grounders, with no provisions for flyballs. Home runs depend on how and where the ball is hit.

Another major change allows the batting player to score a run on a third out, if the base-runner reaches home plate before the third out takes place. For example, if the bases were loaded with two outs as the batter hits the ball into play, the runner on third base could score if a throw to third base forcing out the runner from second base (thus, the third out) arrived after the runner on third crossed home plate but before the runner from second base reached third base.

Ports
An updated version titled World Championship Baseball was released in 1983. Sears sold it without the MLB license for its private-label Super Video Arcade console, and Mattel's M Network produced an Atari 2600 conversion called Super Challenge Baseball.
 After Mattel Electronics ceased production of the Intellivision system and its assets were sold to INTV Corporation, Major League Baseball was re-released with the new name Big League Baseball. It is in the Intellivision Lives! compilation and in Microsoft's Game Room service as Baseball.

Reception
Baseball was reviewed by Video magazine in its "Arcade Alley" column where it was praised for its inclusion of moveable fielders and "flashy" baserunning techniques like the suicide squeeze. Criticism was given to the somewhat simplistic pitching controls, and the fact that "all batted balls are grounders", but overall the game was described as "blow[ing] away" all other contemporary baseball video games. The game is covered in Video magazine's 1982 Guide to Electronic Games where reviewers noted that the game had "lost none of its luster" since its release. In 1995, Flux magazine ranked the game 37th on its Top 100 Video Games. It praised the realistic graphics and the ability to control each player individually.

It was reviewed in Games magazine.

References

External links
 Baseball at Intellivision Lives

1980 video games
Atari 2600 games
Baseball video games
Intellivision games
Mattel video games
North America-exclusive video games
Video games developed in the United States